This is a list of gliders/sailplanes of the world, (this reference lists all gliders with references, where available) 
Note: Any aircraft can glide for a short time, but gliders are designed to glide for longer.

Argentine Miscellaneous constructors 
 Albatros I - ROSMARIN, Alberto et al.
 Birò Regina
 Degásperi Primario – Argentina – Luis E. Degasperi
 Descole Tío Pelado - Ovidio Descole
 Humek H-2 Metla
 Hunziker Cimarrón – Hunziker, Raúl
 INAV 1 – Horthen, Reimar Inav (Instituto Argentino de Vuelo a Vela)
 Motovelero TA 24 Caracolero 
 Planar ASK-18 AR SCHLEICHER, Alexander / Planar Industria Aeronáutica S.A.
 Sancho Primario – Sancho, Orfeo – built by Sancho, Orfeo & Huguenin, Francisco & Huguenin José & Ruiz, Víctor
 Suarez 1895 glider
 Taglioretti RT-1 – Taglioretti, Raúl
 Vásquez Pampero
 Vila Mainene 1 – Vila, Eliseo

Notes

Further reading

External links

Lists of glider aircraft